Nari (1874-1944) is the pen name for Mela Kake Heme, a Kurdish poet. He was born and died in Marivan. He had a close relationship to Mahmud Barzanji, Taher Begi Jaf and Qani.

Nari's poetry
Nari wrote lyric and mystic poems in Kurdish and Persian. The bulk of his poems are in the form of ghazal. He was mostly influenced by Nalî and Mahwi among Kurdish poets and by Hafez among Persian poets.

References

1874 births
1944 deaths
Kurdish poets
Iranian Kurdish people
19th-century Iranian poets
20th-century Iranian poets
Persian-language poets